Paul Robert Hanna (1902–1988) was a Professor of Education. He wrote books and journals in the educational field. He was a leader in elementary education.

Biography
Hanna was born in Sioux City, Iowa on June 21, 1902, to George Archibald Hanna, a Methodist minister, and Regula Figi Hanna, the daughter of Swiss immigrants. Hanna spent most of his youth in Minnesota. He graduated from high school in 1920 and married Jean Shuman in 1926. Paul and Jean Hanna had two sons and a daughter. The Hannas had eight grandchildren and two great-grandchildren.

Throughout his school and college years, Hanna belonged to many organizations such as the Kappa Delta Rho, Student Council, and the Extemporaneous Team. He attended college from 1924 to 1929 to earn his Ph.D. degree which led him to become a teacher in Washington State University and in 1935 became an associate professor at Stanford University (Nelson). He studied and taught elementary education, social studies, and he had improved the education of spelling as well as had his say in the international development of education. Additionally he consulted public schools and revised their curriculum. 

Hanna taught and developed a wide variety of courses. He advised on doctoral dissertations, founded the Stanford International Development Education Center (SIDEC), served on the Board of Trustees of Castilleja from 1957–1981, and worked as a senior researcher in the Hoover Institution in his last years to generate the Hanna Collection. Hanna wrote over eighty educational essays, sixteen books and several yearbooks before he died at age 85, on April 8, 1988.

The Hanna–Honeycomb House was designed for Hanna by Frank Lloyd Wright. It is listed on the U.S. National Register of Historic Places.

See also
International education
Service-learning

Further reading
 Jared R. Stallones. Paul Robert Hanna: A Life of Expanding Communities, . Pub Date:  May 31, 2002 
 
 BASKERVILLE, ROGER, and SESOW, WILLIAM. 1976. "In Defense of Hanna and the 'Expanding Communities Approach to Social Studies."' Theory and Research in Social Education 4 (1):20–32.
 GILL, MARTIN. 1974. "Paul R. Hanna: The Evolution of an Elementary Social Studies Textbook Series." Ph.D. diss., Northwestern University.
 HANNA, PAUL. 1936. Youth Serves the Community. New York: Appleton-Century.
 HANNA, PAUL. 1966. Geography in the Teaching of Social Studies. Boston: Houghton-Mifflin.
 HANNA, PAUL. 1986. Assuring Quality for the Social Studies in Our Schools. Stanford, CA: Hoover Institution Press.
 HANNA, PAUL, and HANNA, JEAN. 1956. Building Spelling Power. Chicago: Scott Foresman.
 NEWMANN, ROBERT E., JR. 1961. "History of a Civic Education Project Implementing the Social-Problems Technique of Instruction." Ph.D. diss., Stanford University.
 STALLONES, JARED R. 1999. "The Life and Work of Paul R. Hanna." Ph.D. diss., University of Texas at Austin.

References 

1902 births
1988 deaths
American education writers
20th-century American educators
20th-century American non-fiction writers
20th-century American male writers
Writers from Sioux City, Iowa
Writers from Minnesota
Educators from Iowa
Educators from Minnesota
American male non-fiction writers
Washington State University faculty
Stanford University faculty